National Eye Centre is a federal government of Nigeria speciality hospital located in Kaduna, Kaduna State, Nigeria. The current chief medical director is Mahmoud Alhassan.

History 
National Eye Centre was established in December 1992.

CMD 
The current chief medical director is Mahmoud Alhassan.

References 

Hospitals in Nigeria